Major General Bernt Nils Sune Östh (born 20 December 1936) was a Swedish Air Force officer. Östh served as Chief of the Air Staff from 1990 to 1994 and as chief of the Joint Staff (Gemensamma staben) at the Swedish Armed Forces Headquarters from 1994 to 1997.

Early life
Östh was born on 20 December 1936 in Värnamo Parish, Jönköping County, Sweden, the son of Martin Östh and his wife Astrid (née Willstrand). He passed studentexamen in 1956.

Career
Östh was commissioned as an officer in the Swedish Air Force in 1959 with the rank of second lieutenant. He served as a combat control officer at Norrbotten Wing (F 21) from 1959 to 1964 and was promoted to lieutenant in 1961, and served in the Air Staff from 1964 to 1965. Östh attended the Stridsledningslinjen ("Combat Control Program") at the Swedish Armed Forces Staff College from 1966 to 1968 and was promoted to captain in 1967. He was then posted to the Operations Command 3 in the Defence Staff from 1969 to 1972 when he was promoted to major. Östh was promoted to lieutenant colonel in 1972 and was posted to the Swedish Armed Forces Staff College as a teacher of strategy between 1972 and 1975, and he served in Flygvapnets Södertörnsskolor (F 18) from 1975 to 1977, as head of the Swedish Air Force Tactical Command School (Flygvapnets stridsledningsskola, StrilS).

He was head of the Operations Department in the Air Staff from 1977 to 1980 when he was promoted to colonel. In 1979, Östh attended the Swedish National Defence College. He was then head of the Study and Research Coordination in the Central Planning Unit (Enheten för centralplanering) at the Defence Materiel Administration from 1980 to 1981 and from 1981 to 1984 he served as commanding officer of Flygvapnets Södertörnsskolor (F 18). Östh attended the Swedish National Defence College in 1984 and was promoted to senior colonel the same year. Also in 1984, Östh was appointed head of the Planning Section 3 (Planeringssektion 3) in the Defence Staff. He then served as Chief of Staff of Bergslagen Military District from 1989 to 1990 when he was promoted to major general and appointed Chief of the Air Staff, in which position he served until 1994. His assumed the position of Chief of the Joint Staff (Gemensamma staben) at the Swedish Armed Forces Headquarters on 1 July 1994. He served in this position until 1997.

Östh served as the last Chief of the Air Staff before the Air Staff was disbanded in 1994. On 16 January 2019, Östh was present and gave a speech at the inauguration of the new Air Staff.

Personal life
In 1961, Östh married Margaretha Johansson (born 1936), the daughter of Birger Johansson and Wendela (née Lundberg).

Dates of rank
1959 – Second lieutenant
1961 – Lieutenant
1967 – Captain
1972 – Major
1972 – Lieutenant colonel
1980 – Colonel
1984 – Senior colonel
1990 – Major general

Awards and decorations
  Swedish Air Force Volunteers Association Medal of Merit in silver (1988)

Honours
Member of the Royal Swedish Academy of War Sciences (1984)

References

1936 births
Living people
Swedish Air Force major generals
People from Värnamo Municipality
Members of the Royal Swedish Academy of War Sciences